The women's 400 metres at the 2014 IAAF World Indoor Championships took place on 7–8 March 2014.

Medalists

Records

Qualification standards

Schedule

Results

Heats
Qualification: First 2 (Q) and next 4 fastest (q) qualified for the semi-finals.

Semifinals
Qualification: First 3 (Q)  qualified for the final.

Final

References

400 metres
400 metres at the World Athletics Indoor Championships
2014 in women's athletics